Everton Ramos da Silva (born 8 June 1983), known as just Everton, is a Brazilian footballer who plays for Portuguese club Pedras Rubras.

Career

Barueri
Everton joined Heracles after playing in the youth of Grêmio Barueri. In the 2004–05 season Everton scored 36 goals for Grêmio followed by 17 in the 2005–06 campaign which helped to promote Grêmio to the highest division. Instead of choosing one of the bigger clubs in his native Brazil, he signed a contract with Dutch team, Heracles Almelo.

Heracles Almelo
Everton played his first league match for Heracles on 27 August 2006, in an away match against Feyenoord. The match ended in a goalless draw. Everton scored his first two goals on 16 September 2009 when Heracles won 3–0 over Utrecht. With an away goal against Feyenoord on 14 March 2010, he became all-time Heracles top scorer in the Eredivisie, scoring 32 goals.

Later career
On 27 May 2013, Everton signed a three-year contract at Saudi Arabian team Al-Nassr. During his time at the club, he won the Saudi Crown Prince Cup.

After he did not receive his salary from Al-Nassr for five months, Everton signed with Chinese club Shanghai Shenxin on 20 July 2014. He penned a two-and-a-half-year contract.

In 2016, Everton returned to Brazil, and first played for Rio Claro and since also represented Guarani, Taubaté, Ituano, Bragantino and XV de Piracicaba through a period of two years.

In 2018, Everton moved to Portugal where he signed with third division club Cinfães. In 2019, he moved to Paredes. In 2020, he signed with Pedras Rubras.

Career statistics

Honours
Al-Nassr
 Saudi Crown Prince Cup: 2013–14

References

External links
 
 Official website Everton Ramos da Silva

1983 births
Living people
Brazilian footballers
Brazilian expatriate footballers
Grêmio Barueri Futebol players
Heracles Almelo players
Al Nassr FC players
Shanghai Shenxin F.C. players
Rio Claro Futebol Clube players
Guarani FC players
Esporte Clube Taubaté players
Ituano FC players
Clube Atlético Bragantino players
Esporte Clube XV de Novembro (Piracicaba) players
C.D. Cinfães players
U.S.C. Paredes players
Chinese Super League players
Eredivisie players
Saudi Professional League players
Campeonato Brasileiro Série C players
Campeonato Brasileiro Série D players
Campeonato de Portugal (league) players
Brazilian expatriate sportspeople in China
Expatriate footballers in China
Brazilian expatriate sportspeople in the Netherlands
Expatriate footballers in the Netherlands
Brazilian expatriate sportspeople in Saudi Arabia
Expatriate footballers in Saudi Arabia
Brazilian expatriate sportspeople in Portugal
Expatriate footballers in Portugal
Association football forwards
F.C. Pedras Rubras players
Footballers from São Paulo